Peter J. Camiel (January 30, 1910 – January 31, 1991) was an American politician from Pennsylvania who served as a  Democratic member of the Pennsylvania State Senate for the 3rd district from 1953 to 1964.

Career
Camiel started his political career as a ward leader in Philadelphia.  He became a millionaire running a wholesale beer distribution business.

He served as Chairman of the Philadelphia Democratic Party from 1969 to 1976, when he lost a power struggle with Mayor Frank Rizzo.  Camiel had helped get Rizzo elected in 1971 but they became bitter rivals.

Camiel became leader of the 5th ward in Philadelphia, known as Center City, and served in that capacity for over 40 years.

Camiel was nominated to the Pennsylvania Turnpike Commission by Governor Milton Shapp in 1975. In 1980, he and three other defendants, including Vince Fumo and Thomas Nolan, were convicted of placing "ghost workers" on state payroll. The charges were thrown out in August 1981. He was suspended from the Turnpike Commission as a result of the indictment but returned in December 1981. He was renominated for a four-year term by Governor Bob Casey Sr. in 1987. He served on the commission until his death in 1991.

Peter J Camiel died of lung cancer on January 31, 1991, at Valley Forge, Pennsylvania, and is interred at Wetherills Cemetery in Phoenixville, Pennsylvania.

Legacy
A rest area on the Pennsylvania Turnpike is named in his honor.

References

1910 births
1991 deaths
Democratic Party Pennsylvania state senators
Deaths from lung cancer in Pennsylvania
20th-century American politicians